Cooper Estates is a subdivision community in Northeastern Madison County, Alabama, and is in the United States. Cooper Estates is in the Maysville and Ryland area with the zip code 35811. The subdivision was built in 1991.

External links

Maysville Alabama News

Geography of Madison County, Alabama
Huntsville-Decatur, AL Combined Statistical Area
Neighborhoods in Alabama
Populated places established in 1991
1991 establishments in Alabama